"Bet Your Heart on Me" is a song written by Jim McBride and recorded by American country music artist Johnny Lee.  It was released in September 1981 as the lead single and title track from the album Bet Your Heart on Me.  The song was Lee's third number one on the country chart.  The single stayed at number one for one week and spent a total of ten weeks on the chart.

Charts

References

1981 singles
1981 songs
Johnny Lee (singer) songs
Song recordings produced by Jim Ed Norman
Full Moon Records singles
Asylum Records singles
Songs written by Jim McBride (songwriter)